The LNWR 18-inch Goods was a class of 310 0-6-0 freight steam locomotives built by the London and North Western Railway at their Crewe Works between 1880 and 1902.

They were also known officially as the  Express Goods 5 ft 0in, and unofficially as the Crested Goods or Cauliflower Class, due to the application of the large LNWR crest on the middle splasher in the original livery.

Design
The design featured a boiler pressed to  delivering saturated steam to two  cylinders connected by Joy valve gear to the driving wheels.

A tank locomotive version was also produced as the LNWR 18in Tank Class 0-6-2T.

Service
Two locomotives were withdrawn before the 1923 Grouping, leaving 308 to pass to the London, Midland and Scottish Railway, who gave them power classification 2F, and renumbered them 8315–8624. The LMS later added them to the duplicate list by the addition of 20000 to their numbers to make room for additional LMS Stanier Class 8F locomotives.

Sixty-nine locomotives entered British Railways (BR) stock in 1948.  BR allocated them the numbers 58362–58430, as adding 40000 to their numbers as was done with most ex-LMS locomotives would have taken them into the 6xxxx ex-LNER series.  The last one was withdrawn from British Railways service in 1955.  None were preserved.

References 

0-6-0 locomotives
Webb 18in Goods
Railway locomotives introduced in 1880
Standard gauge steam locomotives of Great Britain
C n2 locomotives
Scrapped locomotives